Cape Dutch architecture is an architectural style found mostly in the Western Cape of South Africa, but modern examples of the style have also been exported as far afield as Western Australia and New Zealand, typically on wine estates. The style was prominent in the early days (17th century) of the Cape Colony, and the name derives from the initial settlers of the Cape being primarily Dutch. The style has roots in medieval Netherlands, Germany, France and Indonesia.

Architectural features

Houses in this style have a distinctive and recognizable design, with a prominent feature being the grand, ornately rounded clock gables, reminiscent of features in townhouses of Amsterdam built in the Dutch style. Whilst this feature is probably the most recognizable, it is not a defining feature of the style. The manor house on the "Uitkyk" Wine Estate, Stellenbosch, for example does not have a gable at all, but remains clearly in the Cape Dutch Style. In the late 18th century, Georgian influenced neoclassical Cape Dutch architecture was very popular however only three houses in this style remain. The houses are also usually H-shaped, with the front section of the house usually being flanked by two wings running perpendicular to it. 

The Cape Dutch architectural style is defined by the following characteristics:
 Whitewashed walls
 Thatched roofing
 Large wooden sash cottage panes
 External wooden shutters
 Long horizontal structures, usually single or double story, often with dormer windows
 Green detailing is often used
 Central gables, reminiscent of a Dutch canal house is a common, but not universal feature
Most Cape Dutch buildings in Cape Town have been lost to new developments – particularly to high-rises in the City Bowl during the 1960s. However, the Cape Dutch tradition can still be seen in many of the farmhouses of the Wine Route, and historical towns such as Stellenbosch, Paarl, Swellendam, Franschhoek, Tulbagh and Graaff-Reinet.

One characteristic feature of South African colonial architecture which has attracted the attention of many observers is the extensive use of gables. Earlier research has repeatedly sought to justify the term `Cape-Dutch' solely by comparing the decorative form of these gables to those of Amsterdam. However, in the second half of the 18th century, the period in which, the entire development of the South African gable tradition occurs, gable architecture had gradually ceased to be built in Amsterdam. North of Amsterdam, along the river Zaan, however, gable design remained vigorous until the capture of the Cape. South African gables have many features in common with gables along the river Zaan, in spite of the different materials used.

Cape Dutch Revival

By the middle of the 19th century the style had fallen out of popularity and many of the buildings were left to decay. In 1893 Cecil John Rhodes purchased the farm Groote Schuur (Big Barn) and hired architect Sir Herbert Baker to redesign the manor house. Baker looked for a Cape vernacular style and drew influence from Cape Dutch buildings. In reality he created an English country home with Cape Dutch style Gables. This led to the Cape Dutch Revival style. In 1902, Baker was brought to Johannesburg by the Randlords following the British victory in the Anglo-Boer War and included the Cape Dutch Gable on many homes on the Rand. Following Union in 1910, the Cape Dutch Revival style became very popular as a South African vernacular style. Unlike real Cape Dutch Architecture, the Cape Dutch Revival style is defined almost exclusively by ornate gables. The rise in popularity of the Cape Dutch Revival style led to a renewed interest in Cape Dutch architecture and many original Cape Dutch buildings were restored during this period.

See also 
 List of house styles
 History of Cape Town
 A Guide to the Old Buildings of the Cape

References

Notes by Dr. Hans Fransen, architectural historian and author of The Old Buildings of the Chicken curry (2004) and Old Towns and Villages of the Cape (2006).

External links

 History and Evolution of Cape Dutch Architecture (with more pics)
 
 McGregor – the best preserved and most complete example of mid-19th-century townscape in the Cape Province 
 Contemporary Cape Dutch Style @ architectcapetown.co.za
 Cape Dutch Architecture

Architecture in South Africa
Architectural styles
African architecture by ethnicity
Dutch colonial architecture
Dutch Colonial Revival architecture
Dutch Cape Colony